Bharat Kalicharan (1971 or 1972 – 13 August 2004), also known as Akku Yadav, was an Indian gangster, robber, home invader, kidnapper, serial rapist, extortionist, and serial killer. Yadav grew up in the Kasturba Nagar slum, which is outside the Indian central city of Nagpur, Maharashtra. He lived and did business in the slum which housed a number of criminals and two rival gangs.

Yadav's earliest known crime was a gang rape in 1991. Yadav and his gang committed crimes like rape, murder, home invasion, and extortion in Kasturba Nagar for 13 years until his death. Yadav tried to create a small business empire; he extorted money, harming and threatening those who resisted him. During his life as a criminal, Yadav murdered at least three individuals. He tortured and kidnapped people, invaded homes, and raped over 40 women and girls. He bribed police, giving them money and buying them drinks to convince them to let him continue committing crimes. As a result, the police not only refused to stop Yadav for many years but supported him. Yadav and his associates gang raped women and girls as young as age 10 as a warning to those who resisted him.

After a woman named Usha Narayane resisted Yadav and his gang, a mob burned down his house. Yadav went to the police seeking protection. On 13 August 2004, he was lynched by several hundred women who stabbed and stoned him. He had chili powder thrown in his face, and his penis was hacked off. The women all claimed responsibility for the murder, and although some were arrested, they were eventually acquitted. Although hundreds of women were involved in the lynching, the State CID had a different version of the events. Senior police sources said the lynching was carried out by four men and that the women who had claimed responsibility were protecting them. None of the women agreed with the police version. Police said that both men and women were present when the lynch mob appeared. On the day of the lynching, BBC News initially reported that about 14 women and several children forced their way into the courtroom and stabbed Yadav to death. A film based on the incident, 200: Halla Ho, was released on 20 August 2021 digitally on ZEE5. A limited webseries called Indian Predator: Murder in a courtroom was released on Netflix depicting the story and interviews of the victims.

Biography

Early life

Akku Yadav grew up in the Kasturba Nagar slum outside the central Indian city of Nagpur, Maharashtra. He had two brothers—Santosh and Yuvraj. Yadav lived and did business in the slum, which housed some criminals and, according to police, two rival gangs who worked the area. In her book Killing Justice: Vigilantism in Nagpur, author Swati Mehta wrote: "by all accounts, a child of the neighborhood, Akku had graduated from milkman's son to local menace."

Crimes

In their book Half the Sky: Turning Oppression into Opportunity for Women Worldwide, authors Nicholas D. Kristof and Sheryl WuDunn wrote: "Akku Yadav was, in a sense, the other 'success' of Kasturba Nagar. He was a deplorable man who had turned an apprenticeship as a small-time thug into a role as a mobster and king of the slum." Yadav ruled a gang of criminals who controlled the Kasturba Nagar slum. They robbed, tortured, and killed people with impunity. Yadav committed crimes for several years as he created a small business empire. He and his gang members often harassed and intimidated people to extort money. Extortion was his main source of income, and he would hurt people if they did not give him money or if they angered him in any way. Yadav characteristically threatened to rape anyone who resisted him. It is known that many of the Yadav's rape victims were Dalits, who face a disproportionate level of difficulty in receiving justice for cases of sexual assault. 

Pratibha Urkude and her husband Dattu ran a small grocery shop and Yadav harassed them for years. He would pick up goods from the shop and refuse to pay or would simply pay much less than was owed. Sometimes he would demand money and become violent if they were unable to pay. Yadav often worried he was being plotted against. As a result, he did not permit men or women to gather and talk. He made sure young boys did not play together, and if they did, Yadav would break up their games. Suspicious that people were asking questions about him, he would warn people against reporting his crimes to police, threatening them if they did so. Killing left inconvenient corpses that required him to bribe police to prevent them from stopping his crimes. 

Rape, however, was very stigmatizing and, as a result, the victims could be relied on to remain silent. Yadav raped people to silence them far more frequently than murdering them. The women who killed Yadav claimed that he had been raping and abusing local women with impunity for over a decade. They alleged that local police had refused to help his victims or pursue charges because Yadav was bribing them. According to Mehta, Akku Yadav's first crime was a gang rape in 1991. His other crimes included rape, murder, robbery, extortion, home invasion, assault, and criminal intimidation. Before his death, Yadav had been arrested some 14 times. In late 1999, he was detained for a year under the Maharashtra preventive detention law—The Maharashtra Prevention of Dangerous Activities of Slumlords, Boot-leggers, Drug Offenders and Dangerous Persons Act 1981.

Yadav allegedly raped so many people that according to residents of the Kasturba Nagar slum, a rape victim lives in every other house there. Yadav allegedly raped over 40 women; his youngest victim being a 10-year-old girl. One person described Yadav as "the Gabbar Singh of Kasturba Nagar" saying, "We stayed mostly indoors when Akku was around". Women have said Yadav and his gang would invade homes any time of the day. He sometimes wanted a motorcycle or would grab a mobile phone or extort money. Yadav and his gang members would beat up anyone who resisted them. He murdered a woman named Asha Bai, a daughter of Anjana Bai Borkar, in front of her 16-year-old granddaughter. Borkar was one of five women arrested for Yadav's lynching. Speaking of Yadav, the granddaughter said: "We were eating dinner when he came to the front door and pretended to be a friend of my brother. When my mother opened the door, he dragged her out and stabbed her. He then cut off her ears for her earrings and her fingers because he could not get her rings." Yadav had reportedly murdered at least three people and dumped their bodies on local railroad tracks. 

One woman described how she and her husband were attacked by Yadav. He came to their house at 4:00– AM–5:00 AM. Yadav knocked aggressively on their door saying he was a police official, and asked them to open it. Once Yadav entered, he stabbed the husband in the thigh with a knife, locked him in the bathroom and dragged the wife by her hair away to a place where he raped her. Yadav allowed her to return after three or four hours. In January 2004, Yadav was banned from entering Nagpur city. An elderly man named Harichand Khorse, who earned a small amount of money playing a musical instrument called a baja, was beaten violently by Yadav because he was unable to pay 100 rupees. According to neighbors in Kasturba Nagar, Yadav once raped a woman right after her wedding. He also stripped a man naked and burned him with a cigarette, then forced him to dance in front of his 16-year-old daughter. Yadav took a woman named Asho Bhagat and tortured her in front of her daughter and several neighbors by cutting off her breasts. Yadav then sliced Bhagat into pieces on the street, killing her. A man named Avinash Tiwari, one of the neighbors, was horrified by the murder and planned to report Yadav to the police. As a result, Yadav butchered him. Yadav and his men gang-raped a woman named Kalma ten days after she gave birth. After what happened to her, Kalma committed suicide; she burned to death after dousing herself with kerosene and lighting it. Yadav's gang pulled another woman from her house when she was seven months pregnant. They stripped her naked and raped her on the road in public view.

Yadav ordered his men to drag girls as young as age 12 to a nearby derelict building to gang rape. Many of Yadav's victims reported his crimes. Instead of arresting him, the police told him who had reported the crime; Yadav would go after them. The police worked with Yadav, protected him and supported him; he gave them bribes and drinks. When a 22-year-old woman reported being raped by Yadav, the police accused her of having an affair with him and sent her away. Several women were turned away by police after being told: "You're a loose woman. That's why he raped you." One woman told the police she was gang-raped by Yadav and his associates. The police responded by gang raping the woman themselves. Twenty-five families moved out of Kasturba Nagar. People however, removed their daughters from schools and kept them locked inside their homes where nobody could see them. Vegetable vendors avoided Kasturba Nagar, so housewives had to go to far away markets to buy food. As long as Yadav only targeted poor people, police would not interfere.

After Yadav raped a 13-year-old girl, he and his men went to the house of a woman named Ratna Dungiri to demand money. The gang smashed her furniture and threatened to murder her family. When a woman named Usha Narayane arrived afterward, she told Dungiri to go to the police. Dungiri refused, so Narayane went to the police herself and filed a complaint. They told Yadav about the complaint. Enraged by her actions, two weeks before he died, Yadav and forty of his associates went to the Narayane house and surrounded it. Yadav carried a bottle of acid and shouted through the door that he would not harm Narayane if she withdrew the complaint. Narayane barricaded the door and refused to surrender. She called the police and although she was told they would come, they never arrived. Meanwhile, Yadav continued to pound on the door and threaten her, saying: "I'll throw acid on your face, and you won't be in a position to file any more complaints! If we ever meet you, you don't know what we'll do to you! Gang rape is nothing! You can't imagine what we'll do to you!" Narayane shouted back insults, and Yadav responded with descriptions of how he would rape, burn her with acid, and murder her. Yadav and his men tried to break the door down. In response, Narayane turned on a cylinder of gas that the family used for cooking and grabbed a match. She warned that if they broke into the house, she would light the match and blow herself and all of them up. The criminals smelled the gas and left Narayane alone.

The neighbors heard about what Narayane had done and were now willing to go after Yadav. Soon there were many angry victims on the streets, and they started to pick up sticks and stones. People threw stones at Yadav's associates. His men saw the crowd's mood and fled. The victims marched through the slum and celebrated. On 6 August 2004, they went to Yadav's house and burned it down. Yadav now feared for his life and went to the police for protection; they arrested him for his own protection on 7 August 2004. Yadav's mother vacated his house. On 7 August, Yadav was due to appear at the city district court and 500 slum residents gathered. As Yadav arrived, one of his men tried to pass him knives wrapped in a blanket; the police failed to notice this. After the women protested, the accomplice was arrested, and Yadav was taken back into custody. He threatened to return and teach every woman in the slum a lesson. On 8 August 2004, a group attacked Yadav while he was being taken before the court; he survived the attack only to be lynched five days later.

Death 

After the police arrested Yadav for his own protection, a bail hearing was scheduled for him on 13 August 2004 in India's Nagpur District Court. Word spread through the adjoining neighborhood that he would be released. The police planned to keep him in custody until everyone had calmed down and then release him. The bail hearing was supposed to take place miles away in the center of Nagpur. 

Hundreds of women marched from the slums to the courthouse carrying vegetable knives and chili powder, walked into the courtroom and took seats near the front. Yadav walked in and was confident and unrepentant. At about 2:30 to 3:00 PM, when Yadav appeared, he saw a woman he had raped. Yadav mocked her, called her a prostitute and said he would rape her again. The police laughed. The woman started hitting him on the head with her footwear. She told Yadav either she would kill him or he would have to kill her saying, "We can't both live on this Earth together. It's you or me." 

Yadav was then lynched by the mob of 200–400 women who showed up. He was stabbed at least 70 times, and chili powder and stones were thrown in his face. The chili powder was also thrown into the faces of police officers who guarded him. The police officers, overwhelmed and terrified, fled immediately. One of his alleged victims also hacked off his penis. The lynching occurred in Nagpur District Court No. 7 on the marble floor of the courtroom. As he was being lynched, Yadav was horrified and shouted: "Forgive me! I won't do it again!". The women passed their knives around and kept stabbing him; each woman agreed to stab Yadav at least once. His blood was on the floors and walls of the courtroom. In 15 minutes, Yadav was dead; he was 32 years old. The mob continued attacking his corpse post-mortem. 

The women claimed the murder was unplanned. One woman said: "We didn't have any formal meetings, but it spread by word of mouth that we had to take united action." The State CID had a different version of the lynching. According to senior police sources, the lynching was done by four men with sharp weapons, and the women of Kasturba Nagar claimed responsibility for the lynching to protect those men. None of the women agreed with the police version, and police said both men and women were there when the lynch mob appeared. BBC News reported on the lynching on the day it occurred saying: "Initial reports said about 14 women and several children forced their way into the courtroom" and stabbed Akku Yadav to death.

Aftermath 

The women returned to Kasturba Nagar to tell their husbands and fathers they had killed Yadav. The slum celebrated, and families put on music and danced in the streets. They bought food and handed out fruit to their friends. Five women were arrested immediately but released following demonstrations in the city. Every woman living in the locality claimed responsibility for the lynching. Usha Narayane was arrested and charged with murder, as were other women. A crowd of 400 women and more than 100 men and children gathered at the courthouse to support the women. The crowd said they would not move until the women were granted bail. In 2012, Narayane was acquitted. Twenty-one others, including six women, were also arrested and released due to lack of evidence. 

A judge noted a lack of reliable witnesses to the lynching, including unreliable police statements, and cited Yadav's autopsy report, which showed alcohol in his system, as proof that he was receiving preferential treatment from police. Retired high court judge Bhau Vahane publicly defended the women who lynched Yadav, saying: "In the circumstances they underwent, they were left with no alternative but to finish Akku. The women repeatedly pleaded with the police for their security, but the police failed to protect them." Vahane also said: "If they took law into their hands, it was because the law and law-enforcing agencies had not given them succour." ACP Dalbir Bharati said: "There are 200 women who say we did it. The investigating officer found no weapon or blood marks on the five women who were arrested, we found no evidence against these women." Shortly after Yadav's death, Outlook, an Indian magazine, reported that local police spoke indirectly about gang-war rivalries between Yadav's group and a smaller one that allegedly supported the women. According to Outlook, a nephew of Yadav swore revenge for his lynching. In 2014, it was reported that all of the remaining accused in the Akku Yadav murder case were released due to a lack of evidence.

In 2011, a documentary about Yadav called Candles in the Wind was released. On the night of 4 December 2013, a nephew of Yadav named Mukri Chhotelal Yadav was stabbed to death at age 30 by two teenagers aged 15 and 17. Mukri allegedly made sexual advances on one of the teenagers' grandmothers and had once threatened her with a knife. The grandmother, who was in her 50s, was teased by Mukri and he often intimidated her. The grandmother told the teens about this and the teens warned Mukri, but he continued to victimize the grandmother. Mukri, like Yadav, also had a history of crime. 

In 2015, a movie inspired by Yadav called Keechaka was released. It was controversial and women protested against the movie because of the graphic violence against women depicted in it. The movie's director, N.V.B. Chaudhary, defended the film, saying it supports women. 200 Halla Ho, a crime thriller film released in 2021 featuring actor Amol Palekar, was based on Yadav.

Citations

Bibliography

See also
List of serial killers by country

External links
Candles in the Wind - A 2011 documentary about Akku Yadav
Indian Predator: Murder in a courtroom - A webseries released on Netflix in 2022

2004 deaths
2004 murders in India
Corruption in India
Deaths by stabbing in India
Gang rape in India
Indian extortionists
Indian gangsters
Indian kidnappers
Indian murder victims
Indian rapists
Indian robbers
Indian serial killers
Lynching deaths in India
Male serial killers
Murdered serial killers
Violence against women in India
People from Nagpur district
Prisoners and detainees of Maharashtra